Samuel Burton (10 November 1926 – 8 October 2020) was an English professional footballer who played his entire career as a goalkeeper for Swindon Town, making 463 appearances in the Football League and 509 in all first-team competitions. Only John Trollope, Maurice Owen and Fraser Digby played more times for the club.

As of October 2018, Burton was still making appearances at Swindon Town's Former Players' Association events, at the age of 91.

He died in October 2020 at the age of 93. He had been diagnosed with cancer 12 weeks prior and suffered from dementia.

References

External links
 Profile at Swindon-Town-FC.co.uk
 Bio from the Swindon Advertiser

1926 births
2020 deaths
Association football goalkeepers
English Football League players
English footballers
Sportspeople from Swindon
Swindon Town F.C. players
People with dementia
Deaths from cancer in England